The 1998 Barcelona Dragons season was the sixth season for the franchise in the NFL Europe League (NFLEL). The team was led by head coach Jack Bicknell in his sixth year, and played its home games at Estadi Olímpic de Montjuïc in Barcelona, Catalonia,  Spain. They finished the regular season in fourth place with a record of four wins and six losses.

Personnel

Staff

Roster

Schedule

Standings

Notes

References

Barcelona Dragons seasons